Dylan Williams (born 14 October 1997) is an English footballer who plays for  side St Ives Town, where he plays as a midfielder.

Career
Williams was a Cambridge United youth graduate, and made his first team debut on 19 April 2016, coming on as a substitute in a 7–0 League Two win against Morecambe.

He had previously been on loan at Soham Town Rangers from February to April 2016.

On 2 August 2016 Williams signed on loan to National League South side Wealdstone until 2 January 2017.

After being released by Cambridge United at the end of the 2016–17 season, Williams signed for Southern Football League Premier side St Neots Town.

On 21 January 2019, Biggleswade Town announced the signing of Williams. After less than one and a half months, Williams left the club and instead joined Lowestoft Town.

It was confirmed on 11 July 2020, that Williams had joined fellow Southern League Premier Division Central side St Ives Town.

References

External links
 Dylan Williams at Aylesbury United
 
 

1997 births
Living people
English footballers
Cambridge United F.C. players
Isthmian League players
People from Saffron Walden
Soham Town Rangers F.C. players
Wealdstone F.C. players
A.F.C. Sudbury players
St Neots Town F.C. players
Biggleswade Town F.C. players
Lowestoft Town F.C. players
St Ives Town F.C. players
English Football League players
Association football midfielders